Gael García Bernal (born 30 November 1978) is a Mexican actor and producer. He is known for his performances in the films Bad Education (2004), The Motorcycle Diaries (2004), Amores perros (2000), Y tu mamá también (2001), Babel (2006), Coco (2017), and Old (2021), for his role as the titular character in the television special Werewolf by Night (2022), and for his role as Rodrigo de Souza in the series Mozart in the Jungle (2014–18). 

García Bernal was nominated for a BAFTA Award for Best Actor in a Leading Role for his portrayal of a young Che Guevara in The Motorcycle Diaries in 2005, and in 2016 won his first Golden Globe Award for Best Actor – Television Series Musical or Comedy for Mozart in the Jungle. 

He and fellow actor Diego Luna founded the production company Canana Films in Mexico City. In 2016, Time magazine named him in the annual Time 100 most influential people list. In 2020, The New York Times ranked him No. 25 in its list of the 25 Greatest Actors of the 21st Century.

Early life
García Bernal was born in Guadalajara, Mexico, the son of Patricia Bernal, an actress and former model, and José Ángel García, an actor and director. His stepfather is Sergio Yazbek, whom his mother married when García Bernal was young. He started acting at just one year old and spent most of his teen years starring in telenovelas. García Bernal and frequent collaborator Diego Luna were friends from childhood in Mexico City.

When he was fourteen, García Bernal taught indigenous people in Mexico to read, often working with the Huichol people. At the age of fifteen, he took part in peaceful demonstrations in support of the Zapatista uprising of 1994.

He began studying philosophy at UNAM, Mexico's national university but, during a prolonged student strike, he decided to take a sabbatical to travel around Europe. He then moved to London, and became the first Mexican accepted to study at the Central School of Speech and Drama. Bernal also attended the European Graduate School.

Career

After García Bernal's success in soap operas, Mexican director Alejandro González Iñárritu offered García Bernal a part in his feature directorial debut, Amores perros (2000). The film won rave reviews, and was nominated for an Academy Award for Best Foreign Language Film.

His next role was Alfonso Cuarón's Y tu mamá también (2001), which was a crossover success into American markets and gained him notice on the international stage, becoming the second-highest grossing Spanish language film in the United States. The next year, García Bernal went on to portray Argentine revolutionary Che Guevara in the 2002 TV miniseries Fidel and the morally troubled Father Amaro in the Mexican box-office record-breaker El crimen del Padre Amaro (2002).  García Bernal again portrayed Che Guevara in  The Motorcycle Diaries (2004), an adaptation of a journal the 23-year-old Guevara wrote about his travels across South America. The film broke the box office record set 3 years prior by Y tu mamá también garnered Bernal a BAFTA nomination in 2005 for Best Performance by an Actor.

He also did some theatre work, during this time, including a 2005 production of Bodas de Sangre, by Federico García Lorca, in the Almeida Theatre in London.

García Bernal has worked for acclaimed directors including González Iñárritu, Pedro Almodóvar, Walter Salles, Alfonso Cuarón, Michel Gondry, and Iciar Bollaín, among others. He has taken on roles in English-language films, including the Gondry-directed The Science of Sleep and The King, for which he earned rave reviews.

García Bernal directed his first feature film, Déficit which was released in 2007. He was cast in the 2008 film Blindness, an adaptation of the 1995 novel of the same name by José Saramago, winner of the Nobel Prize, about a society suffering an epidemic of blindness. As in the novel, the characters have only descriptions, no names or histories; while director Fernando Meirelles said some actors were intimidated by the concept of playing such characters, With Gael,' he said, 'I never think about the past. I just think what my character wants. García Bernal again paired with Diego Luna in Rudo y Cursi directed by Carlos Cuarón.

García Bernal and Diego Luna own Canana Films. The company recently joined with Golden Phoenix Productions to produce a number of television documentaries about the unsolved murders of more than 300 women in the border city of Ciudad Juarez.

In May 2010, García Bernal did a cameo appearance as himself playing Cristiano Ronaldo in Ronaldo: The Movie for the Nike advertisement, Write the Future.

In 2010, he co-directed with Marc Siver four short films in collaboration with Amnesty International. The tetralogy, called "Los Invisibles", is about migrants from Central America in Mexico, their journey and risks, their hopes, and what they can contribute to Mexico, the US and the world. He directed the movies, did the interviews and also narrates the four short movies. He starred in Even the Rain (2010), Spain's official entry for the 2011 Academy Awards.

García Bernal narrated Human Planet for Hispanic audiences, which premiered on Discovery en Español on 25 April 2011 and aired on Discovery Channel in Latin America on 12 May. For the third time García Bernal appeared with Diego Luna in the American Spanish-language comedy film Casa de mi padre, opposite Will Ferrell, where he played a feared drug lord. García Bernal's next projects included a film adaptation of José Agustín's Ciudades Desiertas and the Jon Stewart directorial biopic Rosewater, in which he portrayed Maziar Bahari to widespread critical acclaim. He was set to star in the 20th Century Fox reboot Zorro film called Zorro Reborn. The script is by Glen Gers, Lee Shipman, and Brian McGeevy.

In April 2014, he was announced as a member of the main competition jury at the 2014 Cannes Film Festival.

In June 2014, he began production as the star of the dramatic comedy Zoom, directed by Pedro Morelli.

In 2014, he was cast in the lead role of Rodrigo de Souza in the Amazon Studios comedy-drama television series Mozart in the Jungle. His performance in the show was met with rave reviews, earning him a Golden Globe Award in 2016.

In 2016, he starred in two movies that were submitted for the Academy Award for Best Foreign Language Film, Desierto (Mexico) and Neruda (Chile).

In 2017, he was announced as a member of the U.S. Dramatic Jury at the 2017 Sundance Film Festival. That same year, he provided the voice of Héctor, an undead trickster and one of the main protagonists of the Pixar animated film Coco.

García Bernal founded The Ambulante Documentary Film Festival, which works to bring documentary films to places where they are rarely shown, and helped to create the Amnesty International Short Documentary Series Los Invisibles. For this work, he was awarded the Washington Office on Latin America's Human Rights Award in 2011.

In October 2019, García Bernal and Diego Luna announced they were joining the Creative Advisory Board for TV and Film development company EXILE Content along with Adam Grant.

In 2021, García Bernal starred in the M. Night Shyamalan thriller Old. In November 2021, Bernal was cast in the Disney+ special Werewolf by Night by Marvel Studios, based on the comics character of the same name.

Personal life
García Bernal and Argentine actress Dolores Fonzi met on the set of Vidas privadas in 2001. On 8 January 2009 their son was born in Madrid, Spain. Their daughter  was born on 4 April 2011 in Buenos Aires, Argentina. He divides his time between Buenos Aires and Mexico City.

He has been in a relationship with Mexican journalist Fernanda Aragonés since 2019. They welcomed a child on 30 September 2021.

He has described himself as "culturally Catholic but spiritually agnostic".

Filmography

Film

Television

Awards

Ariel Award

BAFTA Awards

Cannes Film Festival

Golden Globe Awards

Goya Awards

Other honors

Discography

Collaborations

Soundtracks

See also
 Cinema of Mexico

References

External links

  
 
 Gael García Bernal interview for Rudo & Cursi By Alastair Smart, Daily Telegraph, 8 July 2009
 2014 Cannes Film Festival Screening

1978 births
Living people
20th-century Mexican male actors
21st-century Mexican male actors
Best Actor Ariel Award winners
Best Musical or Comedy Actor Golden Globe (television) winners
Marcello Mastroianni Award winners
Alumni of the Royal Central School of Speech and Drama
Mexican agnostics
Mexican male child actors
Mexican male film actors
Mexican male telenovela actors
Male actors from Guadalajara, Jalisco
Mexican expatriates in Argentina
European Graduate School alumni
Chopard Trophy for Male Revelation winners